Manticavirus is a genus of viruses in the subfamily Gammaherpesvirinae, in the family Herpesviridae, in the order Herpesvirales. This genus was the only genus to consist entirely of marsupial-hosted species as of the time of naming, hence the name component Mantica (Latin: knapsack), in reference to the marsupial pouch.

Species 
The genus includes the following species:

 Phascolarctid gammaherpesvirus 1
 Vombatid gammaherpesvirus 1

References 

Gammaherpesvirinae
Virus genera